Centerville, New Jersey can refer to:

 Centerville, Camden, a neighborhood of Camden
 Centerville, Hunterdon County, New Jersey, an unincorporated community
 Centerville, Mercer County, New Jersey, an unincorporated community
 Centerville, Monmouth County, New Jersey, an unincorporated community

See also
Centreville Township, New Jersey